Senator Guthrie may refer to:

Brett Guthrie (born 1964), Kentucky State Senate
James Guthrie (Kentucky politician) (1792–1869), Kentucky State Senate